Tangyuan or Tang Yuan, or variation may refer to:

Tangyuan (food) (汤圆), Chinese food made from glutinous rice flour
Tangyuan County (汤原县), of Jiamusi, Heilongjiang, China
Tangyuan, Shandong (唐园镇), a town in Linqing, Shandong, China
Tang Yuan (唐渊, born 1989), Chinese soccer player

See also
 Yuantang (language game)
 Tang (disambiguation)
 Yuan (disambiguation)